Acalyptris postalatratus is a moth of the family Nepticulidae. It was described by Wilkinson in 1979. It is known to inhabit the state of Arizona.

References

Nepticulidae
Endemic fauna of Arizona
Moths of North America
Moths described in 1979